Meloe impressus is a species of blister beetle in the family Meloidae. It is found in North America.

References

 Pinto, John D., and Richard B. Selander (1970). "The Bionomics of Blister Beetles of the Genus Meloe and a Classification of the New World Species". Illinois Biological Monographs, no. 42, 222.

Further reading

 Arnett, R.H. Jr., M. C. Thomas, P. E. Skelley and J. H. Frank. (eds.). (2002). American Beetles, Volume II: Polyphaga: Scarabaeoidea through Curculionoidea. CRC Press LLC, Boca Raton, FL.
 
 Richard E. White. (1983). Peterson Field Guides: Beetles. Houghton Mifflin Company.

Meloidae
Beetles described in 1837